Discrimination against LGBT people includes:
Discrimination against lesbians
Discrimination against gay men
Discrimination against bisexuals
Discrimination against asexuals
Discrimination against transgender men
Discrimination against transgender women
Discrimination against non-binary people
Discrimination against intersex people